Serveta were a Spanish scooter manufacturer who were in production between 1954 and 1989.

History
In 1952 a group of Basque businessmen trading as Lambretta Locomociones SA obtained a licence to build Lambretta scooters in Spain.  Production began two years later at a purpose built factory in Eibar.  Sales were good and around 1964 the company began to use the name Serveta SA for its own commercial activities.

In 1982 the company changed its name to Lambretta SAL following a change of ownership.  A downfall in the company's fortunes saw a further change of ownership in 1985 and production transferred to a shared factory in Amurrio.  By the late 1980s sales had fallen even further and scooters were only being built on a made to order batch basis.  Production finally ceased in 1989.

Markets
Servetas were initially only produced for the Spanish domestic market.  However by 1970 Spanish built machines were being sold in the UK by Lambretta Concessionaires alongside their Innocenti equivalents.

By the end of the decade Serveta scooters were being sold in the United States 

and the UK under their own name.

References

External links
 Spanish frame info—a guide to decoding frame and engine numbers on the Serveta

Defunct motor vehicle manufacturers of Spain
Scooter manufacturers
Basque companies
Spanish brands
Eibar